Darwinia masonii, commonly known as Mason's darwinia is a plant in the myrtle family Myrtaceae and is endemic to Western Australia.

Description
The flowers are surrounded by spreading pinkish pendulous bracts at the ends of small branchlets. The bracts have a prominent midrib and are wider at the base and narrower toward the apex. It blooms usually between April and November.

Taxonomy and naming
Mason's darwinia was first formally described in 1964 by Charles Gardner and published in the Journal of the Royal Society of Western Australia. The specific epithet (masonii) honours D. Mason collector of the type specimen.

Distribution and habitat
Darwinia masonii has a restricted distribution, endemic to a small area in the Mt Gibson Ranges in the Wheatbelt region of Western Australia. This species is found generally on upper hillsides and ridges above  on shallow clay soils over laterite, ironstone, granite or near creeks.

Conservation status
Darwinia masonii is listed as a vulnerable species in Western Australia and in terms of the Australian Government Environment Protection and Biodiversity Conservation Act 1999.

External links 
Mason’s Darwinia (Darwinia masonii) Recovery Plan

References 

 

masonii
Endemic flora of Western Australia
Vulnerable flora of Australia
Myrtales of Australia
Rosids of Western Australia
Plants described in 1964